FC Dynamo-2 Kyiv was the second football team of the Ukrainian football club Dynamo Kyiv based in Kyiv, Ukraine. The team was created in 1946, and the club ceased its operations after the 2015–16 season.

History

In 1965, there was created the second team of FC Dynamo Kyiv and replaced FC Temp Kyiv (former FC Arsenal Kyiv). It only competed for one season in the Ukrainian Class B football competitions of the Soviet Union.

In 1992, Dynamo-2 Kyiv was revived based on its double (reserve team) Dynamo-d Kyiv which played in competition for reserves teams of the Soviet Top League. The new team was admitted to the 1992 Ukrainian First League.

In 2004, when there was created a separate competition for reserve teams of the Ukrainian Premier League, the team was preserved and continued to compete at a professional level in regular league competitions until 2016.

The team participated regularly in the Ukrainian First League, since it cannot be promoted to the Ukrainian Premier League, being a reserve team from the FC Dynamo Kyiv franchise. Like most tributary teams, the best players are sent up to the senior team, meanwhile developing other players for further call-ups.

Honors

Ukrainian First League:

Champions: 3
 1998–99
 1999–00
 2000–01

Runners Up: 2
 1996–97
 1997–98

League and cup history

Soviet Union
{|class="wikitable"
|-bgcolor="#efefef"
! Season
! Div.
! Pos.
! Pl.
! W
! D
! L
! GS
! GA
! P
!Domestic Cup
!colspan=2|Europe
!Notes
|-bgcolor=SteelBlue
|align=center font=white|1938
|align=center|Rep 1
|align=center|8
|align=center|11
|align=center|3
|align=center|2
|align=center|6
|align=center|21
|align=center|25
|align=center|19
|align=center|
|align=center|
|align=center|
|align=center|
|-bgcolor=SteelBlue
|align=center font=white|1939
|align=center|Rep 1
|align=center|9
|align=center|9
|align=center|2
|align=center|1
|align=center|6
|align=center|10
|align=center|13
|align=center|14
|align=center|
|align=center|
|align=center|
|align=center|
|-bgcolor=SteelBlue
|align=center font=white|1965
|align=center|3rd
|align=center|13
|align=center|30
|align=center|9
|align=center|5
|align=center|16
|align=center|31
|align=center|52
|align=center|23
|align=center|
|align=center|
|align=center|
|align=center bgcolor=pink|Zone 2, withdrew after the season
|}

Ukraine
{|class="wikitable"
|-bgcolor="#efefef"
! Season
! Div.
! Pos.
! Pl.
! W
! D
! L
! GS
! GA
! P
!Domestic Cup
!colspan=2|Europe
!Notes
|-bgcolor=PowderBlue
|align=center|1992
|align=center|2nd "A"
|align=center|7
|align=center|26
|align=center|9
|align=center|10
|align=center|7
|align=center|33
|align=center|23
|align=center|28
|align=center|Did not enter
|align=center|
|align=center|
|align=center|
|-bgcolor=PowderBlue
|align=center|1992–93
|align=center|2nd
|align=center|15
|align=center|42
|align=center|10
|align=center|17
|align=center|15
|align=center|48
|align=center|39
|align=center|37
|align=center|1/16 finals
|align=center|
|align=center|
|align=center|
|-bgcolor=PowderBlue
|align=center|1993–94
|align=center|2nd
|align=center|7
|align=center|38
|align=center|16
|align=center|8
|align=center|14
|align=center|50
|align=center|37
|align=center|40
|align=center|1/64 finals
|align=center|
|align=center|
|align=center|
|-bgcolor=PowderBlue
|align=center|1994–95
|align=center|2nd
|align=center|7
|align=center|42
|align=center|19
|align=center|8
|align=center|15
|align=center|65
|align=center|40
|align=center|65
|align=center|1/16 finals
|align=center|
|align=center|
|align=center|
|-bgcolor=PowderBlue
|align=center|1995–96
|align=center|2nd
|align=center|6
|align=center|42
|align=center|20
|align=center|12
|align=center|10
|align=center|64
|align=center|42
|align=center|72
|align=center|1/8 finals
|align=center|
|align=center|
|align=center|
|-bgcolor=PowderBlue
|align=center|1996–97
|align=center|2nd
|align=center bgcolor=silver|2
|align=center|46
|align=center|29
|align=center|8
|align=center|9
|align=center|91
|align=center|33
|align=center|95
|align=center|1/16 finals
|align=center|
|align=center|
|align=center|
|-bgcolor=PowderBlue
|align=center|1997–98
|align=center|2nd
|align=center bgcolor=silver|2
|align=center|42
|align=center|28
|align=center|9
|align=center|5
|align=center|90
|align=center|31
|align=center|93
|align=center|1/32 finals
|align=center|
|align=center|
|align=center|
|-bgcolor=PowderBlue
|align=center|1998–99
|align=center|2nd
|align=center bgcolor=gold|1
|align=center|38
|align=center|27
|align=center|7
|align=center|4
|align=center|78
|align=center|27
|align=center|88
|align=center|1/64 finals
|align=center|
|align=center|
|align=center|
|-bgcolor=PowderBlue
|align=center|1999–00
|align=center|2nd
|align=center bgcolor=gold|1
|align=center|34
|align=center|22
|align=center|7
|align=center|5
|align=center|75
|align=center|21
|align=center|73
|align=center|Did not enter
|align=center|
|align=center|
|align=center|
|-bgcolor=PowderBlue
|align=center|2000–01
|align=center|2nd
|align=center bgcolor=gold|1
|align=center|34
|align=center|18
|align=center|14
|align=center|2
|align=center|61
|align=center|25
|align=center|68
|align=center|Did not enter
|align=center|
|align=center|
|align=center|
|-bgcolor=PowderBlue
|align=center|2001–02
|align=center|2nd
|align=center|8
|align=center|34
|align=center|11
|align=center|14
|align=center|9
|align=center|42
|align=center|32
|align=center|47
|align=center|
|align=center|
|align=center|
|align=center|
|-bgcolor=PowderBlue
|align=center|2002–03
|align=center|2nd
|align=center bgcolor=tan|3
|align=center|34
|align=center|18
|align=center|10
|align=center|6
|align=center|56
|align=center|28
|align=center|64
|align=center|
|align=center|
|align=center|
|align=center|
|-bgcolor=PowderBlue
|align=center|2003–04
|align=center|2nd
|align=center|4
|align=center|34
|align=center|18
|align=center|5
|align=center|11
|align=center|65
|align=center|35
|align=center|59
|align=center|
|align=center|
|align=center|
|align=center|
|-bgcolor=PowderBlue
|align=center|2004–05
|align=center|2nd
|align=center|4
|align=center|34
|align=center|16
|align=center|6
|align=center|12
|align=center|48
|align=center|33
|align=center|54
|align=center|
|align=center|
|align=center|
|align=center|
|-bgcolor=PowderBlue
|align=center|2005–06
|align=center|2nd
|align=center|5
|align=center|34
|align=center|15
|align=center|7
|align=center|12
|align=center|51
|align=center|36
|align=center|52
|align=center|
|align=center|
|align=center|
|align=center|
|-bgcolor=PowderBlue
|align=center|2006–07
|align=center|2nd
|align=center|6
|align=center|36
|align=center|17
|align=center|8
|align=center|11
|align=center|53
|align=center|37
|align=center|59
|align=center|
|align=center|
|align=center|
|align=center|
|-bgcolor=PowderBlue
|align=center|2007–08
|align=center|2nd
|align=center|5
|align=center|38
|align=center|19
|align=center|6
|align=center|13
|align=center|64
|align=center|52
|align=center|63
|align=center|
|align=center|
|align=center|
|align=center|
|-bgcolor=PowderBlue
|align=center|2008–09
|align=center|2nd
|align=center|8
|align=center|32
|align=center|11
|align=center|14
|align=center|7
|align=center|43
|align=center|42
|align=center|47
|align=center|
|align=center|
|align=center|
|align=center|
|-bgcolor=PowderBlue
|align=center|2009–10
|align=center|2nd
|align=center|13
|align=center|34
|align=center|12
|align=center|5
|align=center|17
|align=center|35
|align=center|46
|align=center|41
|align=center|
|align=center|
|align=center|
|align=center|
|-bgcolor=PowderBlue
|align=center|2010–11
|align=center|2nd
|align=center|8
|align=center|34
|align=center|15
|align=center|7
|align=center|12
|align=center|39
|align=center|35
|align=center|52
|align=center|
|align=center|
|align=center|
|align=center|
|-bgcolor=PowderBlue
|align=center|2011–12
|align=center|2nd
|align=center|8
|align=center|34
|align=center|15
|align=center|5
|align=center|14
|align=center|39
|align=center|39
|align=center|50
|align=center|
|align=center|
|align=center|
|align=center|
|-bgcolor=PowderBlue
|align=center|2012–13
|align=center|2nd
|align=center|15
|align=center|34 	
|align=center|8 		
|align=center|6 	
|align=center|20 	
|align=center|31 	
|align=center|55 	
|align=center|30
|align=center|
|align=center|
|align=center| 
|align=center|Won play-off
|-bgcolor=PowderBlue
|align=center|2013–14
|align=center|2nd
|align=center|14
|align=center|30
|align=center|8
|align=center|8
|align=center|14
|align=center|29
|align=center|30
|align=center|32
|align=center|
|align=center|
|align=center|
|align=center| 
|-bgcolor=PowderBlue
|align=center|2014–15
|align=center|2nd
|align=center|6
|align=center|30
|align=center|12
|align=center|8
|align=center|10
|align=center|35
|align=center|29
|align=center|44
|align=center|
|align=center|
|align=center|
|align=center|
|-bgcolor=PowderBlue
|align=center|2015–16
|align=center|2nd
|align=center|11
|align=center|30 	
|align=center|9 	
|align=center|9 	
|align=center|12 	
|align=center|27 	
|align=center|34 	
|align=center|36
|align=center|
|align=center|
|align=center|
|align=center bgcolor=pink|Withdrew after the season
|}

Coaches

 Hennadiy Lytovchenko (2006 – 21 Dec 2010)
 Andriy Husin (21 Dec 2010 – 2 Jul 2013)
 Alyaksandr Khatskevich (2 Jul 2013 – 4 Dec 2014)
 Vadym Yevtushenko (15 Dec 2014 – Jun 2016)

Notes and references

See also
Dynamo FC
Dynamo (sports society)
FC Dynamo Kyiv Reserves and Youth Team
FC Dynamo Kyiv
FC Dynamo-3 Kyiv

 
Dynamo-2 Kyiv, FC
Dynamo-2 Kyiv
Dynamo-2 Kyiv
FC Dynamo Kyiv
1946 establishments in Ukraine
2016 disestablishments in Ukraine
Association football clubs established in 1946
Association football clubs disestablished in 2016